Howmeh-ye Sarpol Rural District is a rural district (dehestan) in the Central District of Sarpol-e Zahab County, Kermanshah Province, Iran. At the 2006 census, its population was 13,768, in 2,990 families. The rural district has 50 villages.

References 

Rural Districts of Kermanshah Province
Sarpol-e Zahab County